The Ivorian Handball Federation (FIHB) is the administrative and controlling body for handball and beach handball in Republic of Côte d'Ivoire. Founded in 1960, FIHB is a member of African Handball Confederation (CAHB) and the International Handball Federation (IHF).

National teams
 Ivory Coast men's national handball team
 Ivory Coast men's national junior handball team
 Ivory Coast women's national handball team

References

External links
 Official website  
 Ivory Coast at the IHF website.
 Ivory Coast at the CAHB website.

Handball in Ivory Coast
Handball
Sports organizations established in 1960
1960 establishments in Ivory Coast
Handball governing bodies
African Handball Confederation
National members of the International Handball Federation
Organizations based in Abidjan